This uniform polyhedron compound is a composition of 5 nonconvex great rhombicuboctahedra, in the same arrangement (i.e. sharing vertices with) the compound of 5 truncated cubes.

References 
.

Polyhedral compounds